Snoop is a noun referring to a busybody who pries into the business of others; it is also a verb referring to the act of snooping.

Snoop may also refer to:

People with the name
 Snoop Conner (born 2000), American football player
 Snoop Dogg, an American rapper, actor and music producer
 Felicia Pearson, nicknamed "Snoop", the actress who plays the eponymous character on The Wire

Arts, entertainment, and media
 Snoop (The Wire), a character in the television series The Wire
 Snoopy, a famous Beagle in the comic strip Peanuts

Computing and technology
 Snoop (software), a utility to capture and inspect network packets, included with the Solaris operating system
 Bus snooping in a microprocessor's cache coherency mechanism

Other uses
Eastern Ultralights Snoop, a family of ultralight aircraft

See also 
Snooping (disambiguation)
Snoopy (disambiguation)